Indonesia and Mongolia established diplomatic relations in 1956. Mongolia has an embassy in Jakarta, while the Indonesian embassy in Beijing is also accredited to Mongolia.

Mongolia is planning to have a Center of Indonesian Studies, located in Mongolian National University. This institution will served as a learning center for Mongolian students, professors and common people wishing to learn various aspects of Indonesian studies, includes language, culture, history, politics and economy.

High level visits 
There are three Indonesian presidents that have visited Mongolia. Indonesia's first president, Sukarno in 1956, Megawati Soekarnoputri in 2003, and  Susilo Bambang Yudhoyono in September 2012.

See also
Mongol invasion of Java

Notes

External links
The Embassy of Republic of Indonesia in Beijing, China, also accredited to Mongolia
The Embassy of Mongolia in Jakarta, Indonesia

 
Mongolia
Bilateral relations of Mongolia